Fernand Wertz (29 January 1894 – 28 November 1971) was a Belgian football coach and striker. He was born in Dolhain.

He began to play by Dolhain FC in 1906 by youth team and two years later take Antwerp FC him over and make his debut in 1910–1911 with two goals in one game. Wertz played five times for Belgium, scoring one goal.

International career
Wertz was a squad member of the Belgian team at the 1920 Summer Olympics.

Career as coach
 1930–1934: K. Lyra 
 1938–1939: Antwerp FC
 1942–1945: Standard de Liège
 1948–1950: K. Lyra

References

External links
 Profile at rafcmuseum.be 
 
 

1894 births
1971 deaths
Belgian footballers
Belgium international footballers
Royal Antwerp F.C. players
Belgian football managers
Royal Antwerp F.C. managers
Standard Liège managers
Footballers at the 1920 Summer Olympics
Olympic footballers of Belgium
Olympic gold medalists for Belgium
Association football forwards
K. Lyra managers